The 2000 AFF Championship, officially known as the 2000 Tiger Cup, was the third edition of the AFF Championship and was held in Thailand from 5 November 2000 to 18 November 2000.

Singapore had been the defending champions, but was eliminated in group stage. Thailand won the tournament by a 4–1 victory in the final against Indonesia to secure their second title.

Teams 
No qualification was required for this edition of the tournament and national teams from nine of the ten member associations of the ASEAN Football Federation have entered.  Brunei withdrew due to "unforeseen circumstances".

The participating nations:

Venues

Squads

Match officials

Tournament 
All times are Thailand Standard Time - (THA) UTC+7

Group stage

Group A 

Matches played in Chiang Mai.

Group B 

Matches played in Songkhla.

Knockout stage

Semi-finals

Third place play-off

Final

Awards

Goalscorers 

5 goals
  Gendut Doni Christiawan
  Worrawoot Srimaka

4 goals
  Rusdi Suparman
  Kiatisuk Senamuang
  Vũ Công Tuyền

3 goals
  Hok Sochetra
  Kurniawan Dwi Yulianto
  Azman Adnan
  Lê Huỳnh Đức

2 goals
  Uston Nawawi
  Ahmad Shahrul Azhar Sofian
  Hairuddin Omar
  Rafi Ali
  Nguyễn Hồng Sơn

1 goal
  Pok Chanthan
  Chea Makara

1 goal
  Aji Santoso
  Eko Purdjianto
  Seto Nurdiantoro
  Rosdi Talib
  Aung Kyaw Tun
  Thet Naing Soe
  Zaw Htike
  Nay Thu Hlaing
  Nazri Nasir
  Steven Tan Teng Chuan
  Sakesan Pituratana
  Surachai Jaturapattarapong
  Dusit Chalermsan
  Anurak Srikerd
  Tawan Sripan
  Tanongsak Prajakkata
  Nguyễn Văn Sỹ
  Phạm Hùng Dũng
  Vũ Minh Hiếu
  Văn Sỹ Thủy

Team statistics
This table will show the ranking of teams throughout the tournament.

References

Notes

External links 
 Tiger Cup 2000 at ASEAN Football Federation official website
 Tiger Cup 2000 - Full info at RSSSF
 Tiger Cup 2000 at ThaiFootball.com

 
AFF Championship
AFF Championship, 2000
AFF Championship tournaments
International association football competitions hosted by Thailand